Sir Alfred Cuschieri  (born 30 September 1938) is a Maltese-British surgeon and academic. He is most notable for his pioneering contribution to the development and clinical implementation of minimal access surgery, also known as key-hole surgery. He has been Professor of Surgery at the Scuola Superiore Sant'Anna in Pisa, Italy, since 2003 as well as Chief Scientific Advisor to the Institute of Medical Science and Technology at the University of Dundee since 2008.

Career 

Cuschieri obtained his medical degree from the Royal University of Malta in 1961. Soon after graduation he left Malta for the United Kingdom to undertake further research into his areas of surgical and technological interest at the University of Liverpool. At Liverpool, he rose to become a lecturer in the medical school and then, in 1974, to a Personal Chair in Surgery.

In 1976, Cuschieri moved to Scotland to join the University of Dundee School of Medicine as Professor of Surgery and Chairman of the Surgery and Molecular Oncology Department. It was while working at Ninewells Hospital in the city that he and his team first began researching the medical and technological basis for minimal access surgery. Cuschieri's team took advantage of, among other internal and external ergonomic developments, smaller cameras allowing insertion into the incision made in the skin; as a result of this progress the first minimally invasive surgery in the UK was carried out at Ninewells in 1987.

A lack of appropriate training in this form of surgery, and instances of procedures going wrong even resulting in deaths, led to some concern and mistrust in the new techniques. As a result, training units were set up at hospitals and medical schools around the UK with one of the first designated in 1993 under Cuschieri's directorship. Cuschieri holds some fifty-eight patents for various surgical instruments and has been originally published around five hundred times in peer-reviewed journals. He became European Editor-in-Chief of Surgical Endoscopy in 1992.

Honours and awards 

1961 Pfizer Prize
1973 Moynihan Prize, Association of Surgeons of Great Britain & Ireland
1994 Honorary Fellow, Italian Surgical Society
1996 Ernest Miles Medal
1997 Gold Medal, Royal College of Surgeons of Edinburgh
1998 Knight Bachelor
1998 Fellow of the Academy of Medical Science
1998 Fellow of the Royal Society of Edinburgh
1999 Queen's Award for Higher and Continued Education
2003 President’s Medal, Royal College of Surgeons of Edinburgh

Publications

References

External links 
BBC Radio 4 Interview with Cuschieri

1938 births
Maltese surgeons
British surgeons
British medical researchers
University of Malta alumni
Academics of the University of Dundee
Academics of the University of Liverpool
Knights Bachelor
Living people
Maltese emigrants to the United Kingdom